The 2020 FA Vase Final was the 46th final of the Football Association's cup competition for teams at levels 9–11 of the English football league system. The match was contested between Consett  and Hebburn Town. The final was finally played behind closed doors on 3 May 2021, after the date of 27 September 2020 was abandoned with the hope of allowing fans into the stadium.

The match was broadcast live and free-to-air on BT Sport. Presenter Matt Smith was joined by pundits Aaron McLean and Josh Gowling, with Jeff Brazier as the sideline reporter. The commentary team consisted of Seb Hutchinson and Kevin Davies. Radio commentary was provided by BBC Radio Newcastle.

Soprano Emily Haig sang "God Save the Queen" prior to kick-off.

Route to the Final

Consett

Hebburn Town

Match

Details

References

2020
FA Vase Final
FA Vase Final 2020
FA Vase Final
FA Vase Final, 2020